Brian Dalton may refer to:

 Brian Dalton (judoka) (born 1935), Australian Olympic judoka
 Brian C. Dalton, U.S. Navy officer after whom the Dalton Glacier is named
 Brian Keith Dalton, director of Mr. Deity
 Brian Dalton, subject of the State v. Dalton U.S. 2001 legal case

See also
 Jason Brian Dalton (born 1970), spree murderer in the 2016 Kalamazoo shootings